The 1985 North Dakota State football team represented North Dakota State University during the 1985 NCAA Division II football season, and completed the 89th season of Bison football. The Bison played their home games at Dacotah Field in Fargo, North Dakota. The 1985 team came off an 11–2 record from the previous season. The 1985 team was led by coach Earle Solomonson. The team finished the regular season with an 8–2–1 record and made the NCAA Division II playoffs. The Bison defeated the North Alabama Lions 35–7 in the National Championship Game en route to the program's second NCAA Division II Football Championship.

Schedule

References

North Dakota State
North Dakota State Bison football seasons
NCAA Division II Football Champions
North Central Conference football champion seasons
North Dakota State Bison football